Nuhon is a census town in Rupnagar district in the Indian state of Punjab.

Demographics
 India census, Nuhon had a population of 10,158. Males constitute 56% of the population and females 44%. Nuhon has an average literacy rate of 79%, higher than the national average of 59.5%: male literacy is 83%, and female literacy is 73%. In Nuhon, 11% of the population is under 6 years of age.

References

Cities and towns in Rupnagar district